Graham John Knight (born 5 January 1952) is an English former professional footballer. He spent his entire professional career with Gillingham, where he made 245 Football League appearances and scored 10 goals. He had a testimonial match for Gillingham against Tottenham Hotspur on 11 May 1979.

References

1952 births
Living people
Sportspeople from Chatham, Kent
Footballers from Kent
English footballers
Association football defenders
Gillingham F.C. players
Dartford F.C. players
Maidstone United F.C. (1897) players
Canterbury City F.C. players
Sittingbourne F.C. players
English Football League players
English football managers
Canterbury City F.C. managers